Lee Potter  may refer to:

Lee Potter (footballer), an English football player
Cut La Roc, stage name of Lee Potter, a British electronic musician